The Allisons were an English pop duo consisting of Bob Day (born Bernard Colin Day; 2 February 1941 – 25 November 2013) and John Alford (born Brian Henry John Alford, 31 December 1939). They were marketed as being brothers, using the surname of Allison.

Career
The Allisons represented the United Kingdom in the Eurovision Song Contest 1961 with the song "Are You Sure?".  They came second with 24 points.  The song was released as a single on the Fontana label, and climbed to number 1 on the UK NME pop chart, while in the chart compiled by the Official Charts Company the song spent six weeks at number 2 and a further three weeks in the top 4. "Are You Sure" sold over one million records, earning a gold disc. In Germany the single reached number 11. Despite a couple of minor follow-up hits, the duo disbanded in 1963.

Alford initially tried songwriting, but he and Day teamed up for short tours to keep the 'Allisons' name alive. Additionally, in the 1970s and 1980s Alford was joined by other "brothers" — Mike "Allison" and Tony "Allison". By the 1990s, Day and Alford regularly reunited to perform on the oldies circuit.

The Allisons' final public performance was at the "Tales from the Woods" British R'n'Roll Heritage Show #8 at The Borderline Club in London, 2012. A clip from that show can be found on the 'Tales From The Woods' YouTube channel

Bob Day died on 25 November 2013, aged 72, after a long illness.

Discography

Albums

Singles

References

External links
45-RPM website
 45cat.com
 

English pop music duos
Eurovision Song Contest entrants for the United Kingdom
Eurovision Song Contest entrants of 1961
Musical groups established in 1961
Musical groups disestablished in 1963
1961 establishments in England
1963 disestablishments in England